Süchteln is a borough (Stadtbezirk) of Viersen, a town which is the centre of the Kreis of Viersen in North Rhine-Westphalia, Germany.

Süchteln was formerly an independent town; the Catholic parish church of St Clement is at its centre. The church was built in 1481 and has a well preserved tower 73 metres tall.

History

The first mention of the settlement of Süchteln was in 1116, in the books of the Abbey of St. Pantaleon in Cologne. It was granted the right to hold a market in 1423, when it belonged to the Duchy of Jülich. It has been chartered as a town since 1405. There was a celebration of "600 Years of Town Privileges in Süchteln" (600 Jahre Stadtrechte Süchteln) in 2005. The original document with the official seal of Süchteln is in the National Archives of France in Paris.

From the end of the 19th century until the end of the 1950s, Süchteln was a flourishing centre of the textile industry.

In 1970, the city of Süchteln combined with Viersen, Dülken and Boisheim to form the modern city of Viersen.

Local culture

Irmgard of Süchteln is the patron saint of Süchteln; the annual Irmgardisoktav (Irmgard Week) is held in her honour on the Heiligenberg, part of the Süchtelner Höhen (Süchteln Heights), which are the highest part of Viersen and where there is a chapel dedicated to her.

Among other things, Süchteln is known for the LVR-Klinik Viersen, which is located there. This is a clinic operated by the Landschaftsverband Rheinland which includes the nationally known Rheinische Klinik für Orthopädie (Rhenish Orthopaedic Clinic) and also several psychiatric clinics (including paediatric and adolescent psychiatry), a forensic clinic, a clinic for the treatment of addiction, a gerontological institution, ergonomic and occupational therapy and an institute for clinical training.

Noteworthy residents

Born in Süchteln
 Matthias Nethenus (1618–1686), theologian
 Karl Matthias Schiffer (1867–1930), union official and Reichstag member (Centre Party)
 Karl Müller (1884–1964), politician
 Wilhelm van Kempen (1894–1981), art historian
 Albert Vigoleis Thelen (1903–1989), author and translator
 Hermann Schmitz (1904–1931), artist
 Hellmut Trienekens (born 1938), waste disposal entrepreneur
 Thomas Druyen (born 1957), sociologist
 Frank Rehfeld (born 1962), author
 Roland Kothes (born 1967), radio astronomer

Associated with Süchteln
 Irmgard of Süchteln (circa 1013 - circa 1085), saint who is said to have settled in Süchteln
 Heinrich von Rosenthal (1808–1865), mayor of Süchteln until 1843, then mayor of Kettwig and of Mettmann
 Peter Norrenberg (1847–1894), pastor, historian, and social reformer

Sources
 Joseph Deilmann. Geschichte der Stadt Süchteln. Süchteln: Thelen, 1924. OCLC 72110195
 Walther Föhl. Süchteln, 1558-1958: Eine Festschrift der Stadt. Schriftenreihe des Landkreises Kempen-Krefeld 5. 1958. OCLC 164116215
 Paul Schotes. Viersen-Süchteln. Rheinische Kunststätten 100. Revised ed. Köln Neusser Druckerei und Verlag, 1991. 
 Arbeitsgruppe für Orts- und Heimatgeschichte im Stadtarchiv Viersen. 600 Jahre Stadt Süchteln: Streiflichter. Eigenverlag der Stadt Viersen, 2005. OCLC 70334565

References

External links
 Uwe Micha, Süchteln history site 
 Aerial views of Süchteln 
 Süchtelner Höhen on Panoramio
 Süchteln Brennt annual rock festival 

Towns in North Rhine-Westphalia